Cow Creek may refer to:

Places in the United States
 Cow Creek, Kentucky
 Cow Creek, South Dakota

Streams and rivers in the United States
 Cow Creek (California), a creek in the area now known as Palo Cedro, California
 Cow Creek (Sacramento River tributary), California
 Cow Creek (Kansas)
 Cow Creek (Spring River tributary), in Kansas
 Cow Creek (Montana), a tributary of the Missouri River
 Cow Creek (Jordan Creek), Oregon
 Cow Creek (South Umpqua River), a stream in southern Oregon
 Cow Creek (Washington), a river in Washington

Other uses
 Cow Creek Band of Umpqua Tribe of Indians, a Native American tribe from the Cow Creek area of Oregon 
 Cow Creek Skirmish, Pittsburg, Kansas